Southern Football Club was a 19th-century football club based in Crosshill, Glasgow.

History

The club was founded in 1871, out of the Southern Cricket Club, and originally played under both association rules and rugby union rules.   

Southern was one of the original 16 teams to enter the inaugural Scottish Cup.  It was the last entrant, and the only club not to donate to the cost of the Cup.  The club was drawn to play the Third Lanarkshire Rifle Volunteers, but scratched, and the club did not enter the competition again.  

The club continued to play association football in 1873–74, but it does not seem to have played any association matches in 1874–75.  By 1875 the club had dropped the association football section and was solely playing rugby.

Colours

The club wore red and white jerseys and stockings, with blue knickerbockers.

Ground

The club played at Albert Park in Crosshill.  As a rugby club it played at Mossfield Park in Strathbungo.

References

External links
 Scottish Football Club Directory
RSSSF: Scottish Cup

Defunct football clubs in Scotland
Football clubs in Glasgow
Association football clubs established in 1872
Association football clubs disestablished in 1875
1872 establishments in Scotland
1875 disestablishments in Scotland
Govanhill and Crosshill